Pitt Island may refer to the following islands:

Pitt Island, Chatham Archipelago, New Zealand
Pitt Island (Canada), British Columbia, Canada
Pitt Island (Washington), Puget Sound, Washington, United States